The clearfin lionfish (Pterois radiata), also called the tailbar lionfish, radiata lionfish, fireworks fish or radial firefish, is a carnivorous, ray-finned fish with venomous spines belonging to the family Scorpaenidae, the scorpionfishes and lionfishes. This species lives in the Indian and western Pacific Oceans. This is the only lionfish species which has spines without any markings. It can also be recognized by the pair of horizontal white stripes on its caudal peduncle.

Taxonomy
The clearfin lionfish was first formally described in 1829 by the French zoologist Georges Cuvier with the type locality given as Tahiti. The specific name radiata means "radiated" or "rayed", thought to be an allusion to the long pectoral-fin rays, which are free of fin membrane distally.

Description
The dorsal fin has 12 or 13 long, venomous spines and 10 to 12 soft rays. The anal fin has three spines and five or six soft rays. The large pectoral fins flare out to the side and are clear and unbanded. The other fins are also colourless. The head and body colour is reddish-brown with about six vertical dark bands of different colour on the body separated by thin white lines. Two white horizontal lines occur on the caudal peduncle which distinguishes this fish from other similar lionfishes.

Distribution and habitat
Clearfin lionfish are native to the western Indo-Pacific region. Its range extends from South Africa and the Gulf of Aden to Indonesia, the Society Islands, the Ryukyu Islands, northern Australia, and New Caledonia. Juvenile fish are sometimes found in tide pools.

Biology
The clearfin lionfish is mainly nocturnal. It spends the day hiding in rock crevices, in small caves, or under overhangs. It emerges at night to feed on invertebrates such as crabs and shrimps.

References

External links
 

clearfin lionfish
Marine fish of Northern Australia
Taxa named by Georges Cuvier
clearfin lionfish